Črnolica is a settlement in the Municipality of Šentjur, in eastern Slovenia. It lies on the right bank of the Voglajna River, southeast of the town of Šentjur. The settlement, and the entire municipality, are included in the Savinja Statistical Region, which is in the Slovenian portion of the historical Duchy of Styria.

References

External links
Črnolica at Geopedia

Populated places in the Municipality of Šentjur